Sanikili is a village located in Regidi Amadalavalasa mandal in Srikakulam district, Andhra Pradesh, India.

References

Villages in Srikakulam district